Anthony Maldonado (born 9 April 1991) is a French cyclist, who currently rides for UCI Continental team .

Major results

2012
 7th Overall Okolo Jižních Čech
2013
 3rd  Road race, Jeux de la Francophonie
 10th Road race, Mediterranean Games
2014
 8th Overall Tour du Loir-et-Cher
2015
 10th La Roue Tourangelle
2016
 9th La Drôme Classic
 10th Polynormande
 10th Route Adélie
2017
 5th La Drôme Classic
 7th Grand Prix de la Ville de Lillers
 8th Overall Tour La Provence
2018
 1st  Overall Circuit des Ardennes
1st  Points classification
 4th Paris–Troyes
 8th Cholet-Pays de la Loire
 9th Route Adélie
2019
 1st  Overall Ronde de l'Oise
1st Stage 2
 8th Cholet-Pays de la Loire
 9th Paris–Bourges
2020
 8th Paris–Camembert
 10th Grand Prix La Marseillaise
 10th Tour du Doubs
2021
 9th Classic Grand Besançon Doubs
 10th Grand Prix de la ville de Nogent-sur-Oise

References

External links

1991 births
Living people
French male cyclists
Sportspeople from Aix-en-Provence
Cyclists from Provence-Alpes-Côte d'Azur